Plymouth Beach (also called Plymouth Long Beach or The Point) is a small village located in Plymouth, Massachusetts, United States. It is located directly south of Plymouth Center, and is adjacent to Plimoth Plantation. Plymouth Beach consists of a motel, a restaurant and a small beachside community along Warren Cove.

Barrier beach
The village of Plymouth Beach is best known for its prominent barrier beach. The beach is approximately three miles in length. It begins just south of the Eel River bridge on Route 3A, and juts out almost due north, running along the last ½ mile (0.8 km) of the river before it empties into Plymouth Harbor. The barrier beach offers protection of Plymouth Harbor.

Plymouth Beach is also an important breeding and nesting site for several threatened and endangered shorebirds, including the piping plover and the least, Arctic, common and roseate terns. The beach is a critical checkpoint in migratory birds flight. The birds stop at Plymouth beach to rejuvenate. The birds' routes typically span up to 3,000 miles (4,858 km) of non-stop flight. The barrier beach is intensively managed by the Town of Plymouth to allow some recreational activities while protecting nesting birds and the fragile barrier beach system. Plover and tern nesting areas are monitored and protected by Town staff.  One of the largest common tern colonies in Massachusetts is located at the point.  Plymouth Beach has a mix of public and private ownership, with 90% of the barrier beach owned by the Town of Plymouth.

Gallery

See also
 Neighborhoods in Plymouth, Massachusetts

External links
 Plymouth Town Website
 Information about Plymouth Beach at Pilgrim Hall Museum

Villages in Plymouth, Massachusetts
Beaches of Massachusetts
Landforms of Plymouth County, Massachusetts
Tourist attractions in Plymouth County, Massachusetts
Villages in Massachusetts